Audio post production is all stages of audio production relating to sound produced and synchronized with moving picture (film, television, or video). It involves sound design, sound effects, Foley, ADR, sound editing, audio mixing, mastering etc.

Film
In filmmaking, audio post production is the creation and manipulation of audio that is synchronized with moving picture. This includes, but is often distinguished from production audio, which is the audio recorded as filming occurs. Most other aspects of audio for moving picture occur during the post production phase, everything done after filming. This also may include sound design or the creation of sound effects, which can occur during pre-production, production, or post production. This applies to television, cinema and commercials. One major aspect of audio post production is the use of automatic dialogue replacement (ADR).

Sometimes the original production audio lacks in performance or quality, and one or more actors work in a sound studio to record some or all of their dialogue from the project.  Other elements such as Foley, music and voiceover are also added during post production.

Music
In music, audio post production includes processes such as mixing and mastering. The audio engineering community more commonly refers to these processes as music production.

Vocal media
Reworking and enhancing voice-based media is prevalent in the form of noise reduction and volume normalization. With the emergence of podcasts, audio post production with a focus on vocals has become more common. Sound recording devices with different characteristics and capabilities such as dynamic range has led to increased demand for consistent sound. With many techniques being adjusted specifically for vocal audio, the field is becoming more understood as unique to music production.

References

Further reading 
Rose, Jay, Producing Great Sound for Film and Video. Focal Press, fourth edition 2014 Book info. 

Music production